The national flag of the State of Israel was adopted on 28 October 1948, five months after the establishment of the state. It depicts a blue hexagram on a white background, between two horizontal blue stripes. The Israeli flag legislation states that the official measurements are 160 × 220 cm. Therefore, the official proportions are 8:11. Variants can be found at a wide range of proportions, with 2:3 being common.

The blue colour is described as "dark sky-blue", and varies from flag to flag, ranging from a hue of pure blue, sometimes shaded almost as dark as navy blue, to hues about 75% toward pure cyan and shades as light as very light blue. An early version of the flag was displayed in 1885 at a procession marking the third anniversary of Rishon LeZion. A similar version was designed for the Zionist Movement in 1891. The symbol in the center represents the Star of David, a Jewish symbol dating from late medieval Prague, which was adopted by the First Zionist Congress in 1897.

Origin of the flag
In the Middle Ages, mystical powers were attributed to the pentagram and hexagram, which were used in talismans against evil spirits. Both were called the "Seal of Solomon," but eventually the name became exclusive to the pentagram, while the hexagram became known as a "Magen David," or "Shield of David."  Later the star began to appear in Jewish art. In 1648, Ferdinand II permitted the Jews of Prague to fly a "Jewish flag" over their synagogue. This flag was red with a yellow Magen David in the middle.
  
The idea that the blue and white colours were the national colour of the Jewish people was voiced early on by Ludwig August von Frankl (1810–94), an Austrian Jewish poet. In his poem, "Judah's Colours", he writes:

In 1885, the agricultural village of  used a blue and white flag incorporating a blue Star of David, designed by Israel Belkind and Fanny Abramovitch, in a procession marking its third anniversary. A blue and white flag, with a Star of David and the Hebrew word "Maccabee", was used in 1891 by the Bnai Zion Educational Society. Jacob Baruch Askowith (1844–1908) and his son Charles Askowith designed the "flag of Judah," which was displayed on 24 July 1891, at the dedication of Zion Hall of the B'nai Zion Educational Society in Boston, Massachusetts. Based on the traditional , or Jewish prayer shawl, that flag was white with narrow blue stripes near the edges and bore in the center the ancient six-pointed Shield of David with the word "Maccabee" painted in blue Hebrew letters.

In Theodor Herzl's 1896 , he stated: "We have no flag, and we need one. If we desire to lead many men, we must raise a symbol above their heads. I would suggest a white flag, with seven golden stars. The white field symbolizes our pure new life; the stars are the seven golden hours of our working-day. For we shall march into the Promised Land carrying the badge of honour." Aware that the nascent Zionist movement had no official flag, David Wolffsohn (1856–1914), a prominent Zionist, felt that the design proposed by Herzl was not gaining significant support. Herzl's original proposal however was for a flag completely devoid of any traditional Jewish symbolism: seven golden stars was representing the 7-hour workday of the enlightened state-to-be, which would have advanced socialist legislations. In preparing for the First Zionist Congress in Basel in 1897, Wolffsohn wrote: "What flag would we hang in the Congress Hall? Then an idea struck me. We have a flag—and it is blue and white. The  (prayer shawl) with which we wrap ourselves when we pray: that is our symbol. Let us take this  from its bag and unroll it before the eyes of Israel and the eyes of all nations. So I ordered a blue and white flag with the Shield of David painted upon it. That is how the national flag, that flew over Congress Hall, came into being." Morris Harris, a member of New York , used his awning shop to design a suitable banner and decorations for the reception, and his mother Lena Harris sewed the flag. The flag was ten feet by six feet—in the same proportions as the flag of the United States—and became known as the Flag of Zion. It was accepted as the official Zionist flag at the Second Zionist Congress held in Switzerland in 1898 and was flown with those of other nationalities at the World's Fair hosting the 1904 Summer Olympics from one of the buildings at the Louisiana Purchase Exposition where large Zionist meetings were taking place. The racial Nuremberg Laws enacted by Nazi Germany in 1935 referenced the Zionist flag and stated that the Jews were forbidden to display the Reich and national flag or the German national colours but were permitted to display the "Jewish colours."

In May 1948, the Provisional State Council asked the Israeli public to submit proposals for a flag and they received 164 entries. Initially the council had wished to abandon the traditional design of the Zionist flag and create something completely different in order to prevent Jews around the world being charged with dual loyalty when displaying the Zionist flag which could create the impression they are flying the flag of a foreign country. On October 14, 1948, after Zionist representatives from around the world allayed the concerns of their Israeli colleagues, the flag of the Zionist Organisation was adopted as the official flag of the State of Israel.

Colours

Interpretation of colours

The Star of David is a widely acknowledged symbol of the Jewish people and of Judaism. In Judaism, the colour blue symbolises God's glory, purity and gevurah (God's severity) (See: Blue in Judaism). The White field represents Chesed (Divine Benevolence) 

The Israelites used a blue coloured dye called ; this dye may have been made from the marine snail Murex trunculus. This dye was very important in both Jewish and non-Jewish cultures of this time, and was used by royalty and the upper class in dyeing their clothing, sheets, curtains, etc. (The dye from a related snail can be processed to form Tyrian purple called .)

Sometime near the end of the Talmudic era (500–600 CE) the industry that produced this dye collapsed. It became more rare; over time, the Jewish community lost the tradition of which species of shellfish produced this dye. Since Jews were then unable to fulfil this commandment, they have since left their  ( strings) white. However, in remembrance of the commandment to use the  dye, it became common for Jews to have blue or purple stripes woven into the cloth of their .

Criticism
Israeli Arab criticism has been raised by the High Follow-Up Committee for Arab Citizens of Israel which claims that Israel's national symbols, including its flag, constitute an official bias towards the Jewish majority which reinforces the inequality between Arabs and Jews in Israel. However, many other nations have religiously exclusive symbols on their flags as well. For example, Muslim symbols are on the flags of Algeria, Turkey, and Pakistan among others, while Christian symbols are on the flags of the Nordic countries, Greece, Switzerland, and the United Kingdom.

Based on the boundaries of the Promised Land given in the Book of Genesis, Palestinians including Yasser Arafat and Hamas have claimed that the two blue stripes on the Israeli flag represent the Nile and Euphrates rivers and allege that Israel desires to eventually seize all the land in between. The Hamas Covenant states "After Palestine, the Zionists aspire to expand from the Nile to the Euphrates," and in 2006, Hamas leader Mahmoud al-Zahar issued a demand for Israel to change its flag, citing the "Nile to Euphrates" issue.  Responding to these claims, Arab writer Saqr Abu Fakhr wrote that the "Nile to Euphrates" claim is a popular misconception about Jews which, despite being unfounded and having abundant evidence refuting them, continues to circulate in the Arab world.

Criticism from strictly Orthodox Jews stems back to their opposition of early Zionism when some went as far as banning the Star of David, originally a religious symbol, which had become "defiled" after being adopted by the World Zionist Organization. In a similar vein, contemporary leaders such as Rabbi Moses Feinstein called the Israeli flag "a foolish and meaningless object" discouraging its display in synagogues, while the Chazon Ish wrote that praying in a synagogue decorated with an Israeli flag should be avoided even if there was no other synagogue in the area. The former Sephardic Chief Rabbi of Israel, Ovadia Yosef, also forbade the flying of the Israeli flag in synagogues, calling it "a reminder of the acts of the evil-doers" and Rabbi Joel Teitelbaum referred to the flag as the "flag of heresy" and viewed it as an object of idol worship. Despite the legal requirement (since 1997) for all government-funded schools to fly the Israeli flag, Haredi Jews generally refrain from displaying the flag at all, although in a rare symbolic gesture in gratitude to state funding, the Ponevezh Yeshiva raise the flag once a year on Independence Day. Some fringe groups who are theologically opposed to renewed Jewish sovereignty in the Holy Land resort to burning it on Independence Day. In 2019, a kosher sandwich shop in Lakewood Township, New Jersey caused controversy when it hung an Israeli flag on Israel's Independence Day.

Notable flags

 The "Ink Flag" of 1949, which was raised during the War of Independence near present-day Eilat.  This homemade flag's raising on a pole by several Israeli soldiers was immortalized in a photograph that has been compared with the famous photograph of the United States flag being raised atop Suribachi on the island of Iwo Jima in 1944.  Like the latter photograph, the Ink Flag raising has also been reproduced as a memorial.
 The Israeli flag that stayed flying throughout the siege of Fort Budapest during the Yom Kippur War, which is currently preserved in the Israeli Armored Corps memorial at Latrun.  Fort Budapest was the only strongpoint along the Bar-Lev Line to remain in Israeli hands during the war.
 The 2007 World Record Flag, which was unveiled at an airfield near the historic mountain fortress of Masada. It was made by Filipino entrepreneur and Evangelical Christian Grace Galindez-Gupana as a religious token and diplomatic gesture of support for Israel. In the Philippines, churches often display the Israeli flag. This record has since been surpassed several times.

See also

Blue in Judaism
List of national symbols of Israel
Flag of the British Mandate of Palestine
Karamanid flag
List of flags of Israel
Dance of Flags

References

External links

The Israeli Flag (Jewish Virtual Library)

National symbols of Israel
Israel
 
Religious flags
Israel
Ethnic flags